Wireless Intelligent Network (also referred to as a WIN) is a concept developed by the TR-45 Mobile and Personal Communications Systems Standards engineering committee of the Telecommunications Industry Association (TIA). Its objective is to transport the resources of the Intelligent Network to the wireless network, utilizing the TIA-41 set of technical standards. Basing WIN standards on this protocol allows changing to an intelligent network without making current network infrastructure obsolete.

Overview
Today's wireless subscribers are much more sophisticated telecommunications users than they were five years ago. No longer satisfied with just completing a clear call, today's subscribers demand innovative ways to use the wireless phone. They want multiple services that allow them to handle or select incoming calls in a variety of ways. 
Enhanced services are very important to wireless customers. They have come to expect, for instance, services such as caller ID and voice messaging bundled in the package when they buy and activate a cellular or personal communications service (PCS) phone. Whether prepaid, voice/data messaging, Internet surfing, or location-sensitive billing, enhanced services will become an important differentiator in an already crowded, competitive service-provider market. Enhanced services will also entice potentially new subscribers to sign up for service and will drive up airtime through increased usage of PCS or cellular services. As the wireless market becomes increasingly competitive, rapid deployment of enhanced services becomes critical to a successful wireless strategy. 

Intelligent Network (IN) solutions have revolutionized wireline networks. Rapid creation and deployment of services has become the hallmark of a wireline network based on IN concepts. Wireless Intelligent Network (WIN) will bring those same successful strategies into the wireless networks. 
The evolution of wireless networks to a WIN concept of service deployment delivers the following advantages, similar to the IN benefits reaped by wireline providers:
• Multivendor product offerings that faster competition 
• Uniform services to subscribers across service areas 
• Efficient network use 
• Service creation and deployment

TIA-41 Standards
TIA-41 describes procedures necessary to provide certain services requiring interaction between different cellular systems to cellular radio telephone subscribers. The standards aim to address the ongoing and developing concerns of the cellular radiotelecommunications industry with regard to useful and effective services requiring standardized intersystem procedures.

References

Wireless networking